Volkan (Ottoman Turkish: Volcano) was a short-lived daily newspaper published in Constantinople, Ottoman Empire. The paper was in circulation between 1908 and 1909 and was one of the Islamist publications which were launched in the Second Constitutional period.

History and profile
Volkan was started by Derviş Vahdeti in Constantinople on 11 December 1908. Vahdeti asked for financial support from Sultan Abdulhamit before launching the paper. However, this request was not accepted. 

The publisher of Volkan was Derviş Vahdeti. He edited the daily until 20 April 1909 when he was arrested. At the beginning the paper was supportive of the new constitution and relatively liberal. However, following the establishment of the Mohammadan Union by Vahdeti the paper became its organ and an ardent critic of the Committee of Union and Progress. The paper published the articles by Said Nursî, future leader of the Nur movement. The articles began to be written in a militant style. Vahdeti argued in Volkan that the Committee should obey the Islamic principles. The paper also featured anti-Semitic materials. Volkan produced a total of 110 issues during its lifetime.

Spin-offs
In the 1940s a magazine with same name was published in Istanbul which shared the political stance of the paper.

References

1908 establishments in the Ottoman Empire
1909 disestablishments in the Ottoman Empire
Daily newspapers published in Turkey
Defunct newspapers published in the Ottoman Empire
Newspapers published in Istanbul
Pan-Islamism
Newspapers established in 1908
Publications disestablished in 1909
Turkish-language newspapers